Konstantin Yuryevich Lobov (born 2 May 1981) is a Russian professional football coach and a former player. He is an assistant manager for Chernomorets Novorossiysk.

Club career
He made his debut in the Russian Premier League in 2003 for Zenit Saint Petersburg.

Honours
 Russian Premier League runner-up: 2003

References

1981 births
People from Kolpino
Living people
Russian footballers
Association football defenders
FC Zenit Saint Petersburg players
FC Luch Vladivostok players
Russian Premier League players
FC Vityaz Podolsk players
FC Dynamo Saint Petersburg players
FC Zenit-2 Saint Petersburg players